San Carlos is a district of Bongará Province, Peru.

References

External links
San Carlos district official website 

Districts of the Bongará Province
Districts of the Amazonas Region